Shar Levine, CM (born 1953) is a Canadian children's author, and designer.

Shar has written over 70 books and book/kits, primarily on hands-on science for children.  For her work in Science literacy and Science promotion, Shar has been appointed to the 2016 Order of Canada.  In 2015, she was recognized by the University of Alberta and received their Alumni Honour Award.  Levine, and her co-author, Leslie Johnstone, were co-recipients of the Eve Savory Award for Science Communication from the BC Innovation Council (2006) and their book, Backyard Science, was a finalist for the Subaru Award, (hands on activity) from the American Association for the Advancement of Science, Science Books and Films (2005). The Ultimate Guide to Your Microscope was a finalist-2008 American Association for the Advancement of Science/Subaru Science Books and Films Prize Hands -On Science/Activity Books.

Shar Levine, or Sciencelady as she is known professionally, frequently speaks at Writer's Festivals and at teacher/librarian conferences. Her science presentations at schools and libraries have been enjoyed by thousands of children.

Fellowships 
 2011 (May 18–27) Marine Biological Lab, Woods Hole- Science Journalism Fellowship 
 2010 (Sept 12-18) Woods Hole, Mass- Woods Hole Oceanographic Institution -Science Journalism Fellowship 
 2010 (June 14–18) Boulder, Co. National Center for Atmospheric Research- Science Journalism Fellowship
 2009 (May 18–22) Kauai, National Tropical Botanical Garden-Environmental Journalism Fellowship

Awards

Book awards 

 Projects for a Healthy Planet:
 Canadian Children's Book Centre 1993 "Our Choice Award".
 The Paperbook and Papermaker:
 Canadian Children's Book Centre 1994 "Our Choice Award".
 Canadian Toy Testing Council - top recommendation.
 National Parenting Publication Award (US) - 1994.
 Everyday Science:
 Canadian Children's Book Centre 1995 "Our Choice Award".
 Science Around the World:
 Canadian Children's Book Centre 1996 "Our Choice Award".
 The Microscope Book:
 Canadian Children's Book Centre 1997 “Our Choice Award”.
 WormWorld:
 National Parenting Publication Award (US) - 1997.
 Parent's Choice Award- Bronze (US) - 1998.
 The Magnets Book:
 Canadian Children's Book Centre 1998 “Our Choice Award”.
 Fun With Your Microscope:
 Canadian Children's Book Centre 1998 “Our Choice Award, starred selection”.
 The Ultimate Balloon Book:
 Canadian Children's Book Centre 2002 “Our Choice Award”.
 The Science of Sound and Music:
 Canadian Children's Book Centre 2001 “Our Choice Award”.
 Backyard Science: finalist:
 2006 American Association for the Advancement of Science/Subaru Science Books and Films Prize (Hands -On Science/Activity) Books.
 the Ultimate Guide to Your Microscope: finalist:
 2008 American Association for the Advancement of Science/Subaru Science Books and Films Prize (Hands -On Science/Activity) Books.
 Plants: Flowering Plants, Ferns, Mosses and Other Plants:
 CCBC Best Books, 2011
 Snowy Science:
 OLA Best Bet
 CCBC Best Books, 2012
 Hockey Science:
 OLA Best Bet, 2012
 CCBC Best Books, 2013
 Dirty Science:
 Winner of Science in Society (Youth) Book Award, 2014
 CCBC Best Books, 2014

General awards 
 Member of the Order of Canada, 2016
 Alumni Honour Award - University of Alberta, 2015
 Co-recipient Eve Savory Award for Science Communication 2006, BC Innovation Council.
 Playthings 1989, Merchandising Achievement, Award of Merit Department Design.
 Sea Festival Parade, 1989, Third Prize Commercial.

Publications

List of books Shar Levine and Leslie Johnstone 
 #Challenge, Scholastic, 2020
Stinky Science, Smart Lab, 2018
Crazy Drink Lab, Smart Lab, 2017
Dirty Science, Scholastic Canada, 2013.
 Hockey Science, Scholastic Canada, 2012.
 Bathtub Science, HarperCollins Canada, enhanced Ebook, 2011.
 Snowy Science, Scholastic Canada, 2011.
 Scary Science, Scholastic Canada, 2010.
 In a Class of Their Own -Animals, Crabtree Publishing, Canada, 2010.
 In a Class of Their Own -Plants, Crabtree Publishing, Canada, 2010.
 USA Today, Weather Wonders, Sterling Publishing Ltd. New York, 2009.
 The Icky, Sticky and Gross Fascinating Factbook, Mud Puddle Books, New York.
 Smart Lab- Amazing Animal Challenge, becker&mayer! Bellevue, WA, 2008.
 Smart Lab- Extreme Secret Formula Lab, becker&mayer! Bellevue, WA, 2008.
 Super Smelly Lab, Scholastic Inc. New York, 2008.
 Ultimate Guide to Your Microscope, Sterling Publishing Ltd. New York, 2008.
 Volcano book and Kit, Mud Puddle, New York, 2007.
 Smart Lab- Human Body Challenge, becker&mayer!, Bellevue, WA, 2007.
 Smart Lab-Indoor Outdoor Microscope, becker&mayer!, Bellevue, WA, 2007.
 Superpower Microscope, becker&mayer!, Bellevue, WA, 2007.
 Volcano Book and Kit, Mudpuddle, New York, 2007.
 Ultimate Guide to Your Microscope, Sterling Publishing Co. Ltd. New York, 2007.
 Smart Lab-Secret Formula Lab, becker&mayer!, Bellevue, WA, 2006.
 Smart Lab- Science and Nature Challenge, becker&mayer!, Bellevue, WA, 2006.
 Smart Lab- Weird and Gross Challenge, becker&mayer!, Bellevue, WA, 2006.
 Sports Science, Sterling Publishing Co. Ltd., New York, 2006.
 First Science-The Amazing Human Body, Sterling Publishing Co. Ltd., New York, 2006.
 First Science- Magnet Power, Sterling Publishing Co. Ltd., New York, 2006.
 Stop Thief! Build Your Own Backpack Alarm, Scholastic Press, New York, 2006.
 Super Secret Formula Lab, Scholastic Press, New York, 2006.
 Secret Formula Lab: Smart Lab, becker & mayer! Bellevue, WA, 2006.
 Extreme 3-D Your Body, Silver Dolphin Books, San Diego, CA, 2005.
 Extreme 3-D Weird Animals, Silver Dolphin Books, San Diego, CA, 2005.
 Extreme 3-D Scary Bugs, Silver Dolphin Books, San Diego, CA, 2005.
 Backyard Science, Sterling Publishing Co. Ltd., New York, 2005.
 First Science Experiments with Nature, Senses, Weather and Machines, Sterling Pub. Co. Ltd., New York, 2005.
 Skyblades- becker&mayer! Bellevue, WA, 2004, (not released).
 Build Your Own Portable Doorbell,  becker&mayer! Bellevue, WA, 2004, (not released).
 First Science-Mighty Machines, Sterling Publishing Co. Ltd., New York, 2004.
 First Science-Nifty Nature, Sterling Publishing Co. Ltd., New York, 2004.
 Kitchen Science, Sterling Publishing Co. Ltd., New York, 2003.
 The Ultimate Bubble Book, Sterling Publishing Co. Ltd., New York, 2003.
 First Science-Wonderful Weather, Sterling Publishing Co. Ltd., New York, 2003.
 First Science- Super Senses, Sterling Publishing Co. Ltd., New York, 2003.
 Build your own Spyscope, becker & mayer! Bellevue, WA, 2002.
 Build your own TV remote control, becker&mayer! Bellevue, WA, 2001.
 Incredible Ice Cream Machine, becker&mayer! Kirkland WA, 2001.
 The Incredible Secret Formula Book, becker & mayer!, Kirkland WA, Troll Communications, New York, 2001.
 Solar Oven, becker&mayer!, Kirkland WA, Scholastic, New York, 2000.
 Shocking Science, Sterling Publishing Co. Ltd., New York, 2000.
 Quick-but-great Science Fair Projects, Sterling Publishing Co. Ltd., New York, 2000.
 The Science of Sound and Music, Sterling Publishing Co. Ltd., New York, 2000.
 Blast Off, a Rocket Science kit and book, becker & mayer!, Kirkland WA, 2000.
 It's my world, you just live on it, becker & mayer!, Kirkland WA, 2000.
 Bath Tub Science, Sterling Publishing Co. Ltd., New York, 2000
 3-D Lungs and Microtongues, Somerville House Books Ltd., Toronto, Penguin Putnam, New York, 1999.
 3-D Bees and Microfleas, Somerville House Books Ltd., Toronto, Penguin Putnam, New York, 1999.
 The Mega Dome Chemistry Book, Wild Planet Toys, San Francisco, 1999.
 Gross Lab, Wild Planet Toys, San Francisco, 1999.
 Fun with your Microscope, Sterling Publishing Co. Ltd., New York, 1998.
 The Optics Book, Sterling Publishing Co. Ltd., New York, 1998.
 The Magnets Book, Sterling Publishing Co. Ltd., New York, 1997.
 Science Around the World, John Wiley and Sons, New York, 1996.
 The Microscope Book, Sterling Publishing Co. Ltd., New York, 1996.
 Silly Science, John Wiley and Sons, New York, 1995.
 Everyday Science, John Wiley and Sons, New York - winner of Canadian, 1995.

Books by Shar Levine 

 Extreme Balloon Tying, Co-Author, Michael Ouchi,Sterling Publishing, New York, 2007.
 The Ultimate Balloon Book, Co-Author, Michael Ouchi, 2001, Sterling Publishing Co. Ltd., New York, 2001.
 Awesome Yo-Yo Tricks, Co-Author, Bob Bowden, Sterling Publishing Co. Ltd., New York, 2000.
 Marbles, A Player's Guide, Co-author, Vicki Scudamore, 1998, Sterling Publishing Co. Ltd., New York, 1998.
 WormWorld, the Worm Book, Somerville House, Toronto, 1997.
 Chocolate Lover's Cookbook, Co-author, Vicki Scudamore, 1997, Sterling Publishing, New York, 1997.
 The Paperbook and Papermaker, Somerville House, Toronto, 1993.
 Einstein's Science Parties, Co-Author,Allison Grafton, John Wiley and Sons, New York, 1993.
 Projects for a Healthy Planet, Co-author, Allison Grafton, John Wiley and Sons, New York, 1991.

Translations of books 
 Le Labo Des Malins, Scholastic Canada, 2010
 Le Labo Sous Zero, Scholastic Canada, 2011
 The Ultimate Balloon Book (Russian), 2004.
 Dolle Knutselpret met Ballonnen. (The Ultimate Balloon Book) Deltas, Uitgeverij N.V. Aartselaar, Belgium, 2004.
 Creations originales avec des Ballons (The Ultimate Balloon Book).  Chanteclerr,  Paris, 2004.
 Pesta Sains ala Einstein (Einstein's Science Parties). Pakar Raya, Bandung, Indonesia, 2003.
 Ciencia Magica, Experimentos extranos y asombrosos,  Albatros tusMaravillas, Buenos Aires, Argentina, (Spanish), 1998.
 Ciencia Con Todo, Experimentos simples con las cosas que nos rodean, Albatros tus Maravillas  Hipolito, Buenos Aires, Argentina, (Spanish), 1997.
 Ecociencia- Experimentos ecologies para chicos, Albatros tus Maravillas (Buenos Aires, Argentina, (Spanish), 1997.
 Projectos para um Planeta Saudavel ( Projects for a Healthy Planet). Editora Augustus, São Paulo-SP Brasil, (Portuguese), 1995.
 Projects for a Healthy Planet, (Korean), 1995.

References

External links
http://www.sciencelady.com
BC Innovation Council Awards recipients: Eve Savory Award for Science & communication 2006
BC Innovation Council 2006, Shar Levine & Leslie Johnstone vignette video
Shar Levine & Leslie Johnstone Video & Award Speech - BC Innovation Council 2006
CBC News, Bright Lights, Oct 30 2006 
Interview with Shar Levine on CityTv-BT Nov 3 2006

1953 births
Canadian children's writers
Living people
Members of the Order of Canada
Writers from Edmonton